Jenny Fransson (born 17 July 1987 in Karlstad) is a female freestyle wrestler from Sweden who participated in Women's freestyle wrestling 72 kg at the 2008, 2012 and 2016 Summer Olympics. 

At the 2008 Summer Olympics, in the 1/8 final she lost 1:3 to Wang Jiao, then in the repechage round Fransson lost to Ali Bernard from United States.

At the 2012 Summer Olympics, she reached the second round, where she lost to Stanka Zlateva.  In the repechage, she lost to Vasilisa Marzalyuk.

At the 2016 Summer Olympics, she won a bronze medal, coming through the repechage.

She won a gold medal at the 2018 European Wrestling Championships and a bronze medal at the 2019 and 2008 European Wrestling Championships.

On February 3, 2020, it was announced that Jenny Fransson tested positive in a doping test for the illicit substance methyltestosterone, an anabolic steroid. This led to her being permanently removed from the 2020 Olympic squad and she was also excluded from the Swedish Olympic Committee's support program Top and Talent.

References

External links
Athlete bio on beijing2008.com
 

Olympic wrestlers of Sweden
Wrestlers at the 2008 Summer Olympics
Wrestlers at the 2012 Summer Olympics
Wrestlers at the 2016 Summer Olympics
Olympic medalists in wrestling
Medalists at the 2016 Summer Olympics
Swedish female sport wrestlers
Sportspeople from Karlstad
1987 births
Living people
Olympic bronze medalists for Sweden
World Wrestling Championships medalists
Wrestlers at the 2019 European Games
European Games competitors for Sweden
20th-century Swedish women